The 1918 USC Trojans football team represented the University of Southern California (USC) in the 1918 college football season. In their fifth and final year under head coach Dean Cromwell, the Trojans compiled a 2–2–2 record, scored 61 points, and allowed 61 points.

Schedule

References

USC Trojans
USC Trojans football seasons
USC Trojans football